The 1990 IAAF World Women's Road Race Championships was the eighth, and penultimate, edition of the annual international road running competition organised by the International Amateur Athletics Federation (IAAF). The competition was hosted by Ireland on 14 October 1990 in Dublin and featured one race only: a 15K run for women. There were individual and team awards available, with the national team rankings being decided by the combined finishing positions of a team's top three runners. Countries with fewer than three finishers were not ranked.

Romania's Iulia Olteanu won the race in a time of 50:11.8 – the slowest winning time recorded at the competition's history. Francie Larrieu Smith of the United States was the silver medallist and Chinese runner Zhong Huandi took bronze to feature on the podium for a second year running. Aurora Cunha led Portugal to the team title, as she had in 1987, with support from Conceição Ferreira and Lucilia Soares. The Soviet Union reached the team podium for a fifth time in as many years through the efforts of Nadezhda Stepanova, Valentina Yegorova and Lyudmila Matveyeva. A unified German team entered for the first time and former East German Katrin Dörre led the team to third place in the team rankings with former West Germans Kerstin Pressler and Christina Mai.

Results

Individual

Team

References

1990
IAAF World Women's Road Race Championships
IAAF World Women's Road Race Championships
IAAF World Women's Road Race Championships
Road
International athletics competitions hosted by Ireland